Grossius is an extinct genus of sarcopterygian fish that lived during the Devonian period of Spain. Its size was about 1 m in length.

References

Onychodontida
Prehistoric lobe-finned fish genera
Devonian bony fish
Fossils of Spain